The 2022–23 Texas Tech Lady Raiders basketball team represent Texas Tech University in the 2022–23 NCAA Division I women's basketball season. The Lady Raiders are led by third-year head coach Krista Gerlich. They play their home games at United Supermarkets Arena and compete as members of the Big 12 Conference.

Previous season 

The Lady Raiders finished the season 11-19, 4-14 in Big 12 play to finish in eighth place. They lost to Oklahoma State in the Big 12 Tournament. They were not invited to the NCAA tournament or the WNIT.

Roster

Texas}}

Schedule

Source:

|-
!colspan=6 style=| Exhibition

|-
!colspan=6 style=| Non-conference regular season (12-1)

|-
!colspan=6 style=| Big 12 regular season (6-11)

|-
!colspan=6 style=""| Big 12 tournament

|-
!colspan=6 style=""| WNIT

Rankings

See also
2022–23 Texas Tech Red Raiders basketball team

References

Texas Tech Lady Raiders basketball seasons
Texas Tech
Texas Tech
Texas Tech